Transport in the Arab League describes the land, air, and water transport methods and infrastructure of the countries in the Arab world. Transport infrastructure in the states of the Arab League has been growing, albeit slowly.

Highways

Regional highways

There are several cross-Arab State roads, crossing the Arab world from its farthest point in the west in Mauritania, to its eastern farthest point in Oman.  The Arab States are connected with roads and highways that cross deserts, mountains and forests. The most developed state with high road infrastructure is the United Arab Emirates, followed by Syria, Saudi Arabia, Algeria, Morocco, Jordan and Egypt, while countries such as Sudan, Libya, Mauritania, Somalia and Yemen seem to have a lot of building to do.

Railways

Egypt has by far the oldest railroad in the Middle East and Africa and one of the oldest in the world, built in 1854 by Khedive Abbas I of Egypt. Now Egypt has the most extensive railway system in the Middle East, and is the only country in the Arab League to have an underground metro system in Cairo.

The Souk Ahras–Ghardimaou line already connect Algeria, Morocco and Tunisia with each other, but Morocco and Algeria have closed the line due to increased tensions. while Libya, Egypt and Sudan are not connected to each other. In the Asian part, almost all Arab states have been connected by railroads, except the Arab states of the Persian Gulf.

Perhaps the most developed railways connecting Arab states can be found between Iraq and Syria, with the Iraqi Republic Railways which run through Syria to Turkey.

Proposed railways

In October 2007 French company Alstom announced it would supply 18 TGV Duplex trains to the Office National des Chemins de Fer du Maroc (ONCF) in 2008. The trains will run at 320 km/h between Tangier, Rabat and Casablanca
There are long-term projects to re-open the Palestine Railway with Egypt
Reviving the Hijaz railway between Medina and Mecca to Damascus, crossing Jordan
The Gulf Railway will run through Kuwait City, Dammam, Abu Dhabi, Dubai and end in Muscat. Other plans of extending it to Manama and Doha are under study

Gallery

Waterways

Pipelines

Ports and harbors

Atlantic Ocean

Boghé
Kaedi
Nouadhibou
Nouakchott
Rosso

Indian Ocean

Fomboni
Moroni
Moutsamoudou

Bender Cassim
Berbera
Chisimayu
Merca
Mogadishu

Persian Gulf

Manama
Mina
Salman
Sitrah

Ash Shu'aybah
Ash Shuwaykh
Kuwait
Port 'Abd Allah
Port al Ahmadi
Port Su'ud

Umm Qasr
Khawr az Zubayr
Al Basrah

Dammam
Jubail
Ras Tanura
Khafji
Khobar

Al Wajajah
Matrah
Mina al Fahal
Sohar

Doha
Halul Island
Umm Sa'id

Ajman
Fujairah
Das Island
Khawr Fakkan
Mina' Jabal 'Ali
Mina' Khalid
Port Rashid
Mina' Saqr
Mina' Zayid
Umm al-Qaiwain

Arabian Sea

Duqm
Mina' Raysut

Aden
Mukalla

Mediterranean Sea

Algiers
Annaba
Arzew
Bejaia
Beni Saf
Dellys
Djendjene
Ghazaouvet
Jijel
Mostaganem
Oran
Skikda
Ténès

Alexandria Port – Port Authority
Port Said Port – Port Authority
Damietta Port – Port Authority
Marsa Matruh

Beirut
Chekka
Jounieh
Tripoli
Sidon
Tyre
Byblos
Tabarja
Damour
Batroun
El Mina
Antelias

 Khoms
 Benghazi
 Derna
 Brega
 Misrata
 Ra's Lanuf
 Tobruk
 Tripoli
 Zuwara

Gaza

Bizerte
Gabès
La Goulette
Sfax
Sousse
Zarzis

Baniyas
Jablah
Latakia
Tartus

Red Sea

Suez Port
Petroleum Dock Port
Adabieh
Sokhna
Hurghada
Safaga
Nuweiba
Al-Tour
Sharm El-Sheikh

Djibouti

Aqaba

Jeddah
Yanbu' al Bahr
Duba
Rabigh
Jizan
Farasan (city)

Port Sudan
Sawakin

Al Hudaydah
As Salif
Mocha
Nishtun

Merchant marine
 bulk: 			46
 cargo:			260 (120 Syria)
 roll-on/roll-off: 		46
 container: 		34
 liquified gas: 		19
 Chemical tanker ships	22
 petroleum tanker: 	111
 Specialized tanker ships	2
 Combination ore/oil	2	
 Refrigerated cargo	6	
 livestock carrier:		13
 passenger: 		81
 short-sea passenger: 	9	
 Foreign Owned		25

Airports

 Abdelhafid Boussouf Bou Chekif Airport                                                              
 Aguenar – Hadj Bey Akhamok Airport                                                    
 Ain Arnat Airport (8 Mai 45 Airport)                                                         
 Ain Beida Airport (Ain el Beida Airport)                                                  
 Aïn Oussera Airport                                                        
 Béchar Ouakda Airport                                                  
 Béni Abbès Airport                                                          
 Blida Airport                                                       
 Bordj Mokhtar Airport                                                   
 Bordj Omar Driss Airport                                                               
 Bou Saada Airport                                                            
 Boudghene Ben Ali Lotfi Airport                                                                
 Boufarik Airport                                                               
 Bousfer Air Base                                                               
 Cheikh Larbi Tébessi Airport                                                       
 Chlef International Airport (Aboubakr Belkaid Airport)                                                   
 El Bayadh Airport                                                            
 El Golea Airport                                                
 Gara Djebilet Airport                                                     
 Ghriss Airport                                                   
 Guelma Belkheir Airport                                                               
 Guemar Airport                                                                
 Hassi R'Mel Airport (Tilrempt Airport)                                                     
 Houari Boumediene Airport                                                  
 In Amenas Airport (Zarzaitine Airport)                                                   
 In Guezzam Airport                                                        
 In Salah Airport                                                 
 Jijel Ferhat Abbas Airport                                                             
 L'Mekrareg Airport                                                          
 Mécheria Airport                                                             
 Mohamed Boudiaf International Airport                                                               
 Mohamed Khider Airport                                                             
 Mostaganem Airport                                                      
 Mostépha Ben Boulaid Airport                                                   
 M'Sila Airport                                                     
 Noumérat – Moufdi Zakaria Airport                                                         
 Oran Es Sénia Airport                                                     
 Oran Tafraoui Airport (Tafaraoui Airport)                                                              
 Oued Irara–Krim Belkacem Airport                                                          
 Oum el Bouaghi Airport                                                 
 Rabah Bitat Airport                                                          
 Reggane Airport                                                               
 Relizane Airport                                                               
 Saïda Airport                                                     
 Sidi Bel Abbès Airport                                                    
 Sidi Mahdi Airport                                                                                                                         
 Skikda Airport
 Soummam – Abane Ramdane Airport                                                    
 Takhamalt Airport                                                            
 Telerghma Airport                                                                                                                           
 Timimoun Airport                                                            
 Tindouf Airport                                                 
 Tiska Djanet Airport                                                       
 Touat-Cheikh Sidi Mohamed Belkebir Airport                                                 
 Tsletsi Airport                                                    
 Zenata – Messali El Hadj Airport                                                                                                                         

Bahrain International Airport
Shaikh Isa Air Base
Sakhir Air Base
Riffa Air Base

Ouani Airport
Mohéli Bandar Es Eslam Airport
Iconi Airport
Prince Said Ibrahim International Airport

Ali-Sabieh Airport
Assa-Gueyla Airport
Chabelley Airport
Dikhil Airport
Djibouti Military Airport
Djibouti–Ambouli International Airport
Herkale Airport
Moucha Airport
Obock Airport
Tadjoura Airport

 Abu Rudeis Airport
 Abu Simbel Airport
 Al Alamain International Airport
 Alexandria International Airport
 Almaza Air Base
 Almaza Air Force Base
 Assiut Airport
 Aswan International Airport
 Borg El Arab Airport
 Cairo International Airport
 Cairo West Air Base
 Dakhla Oasis Airport
 El Arish International Airport
 El Gora Airport
 El Gouna Airport
 El Kharga Airport
 El Tor Airport
 Embaba Airport
 Hurghada International Airport
 Luxor International Airport
 Marsa Alam International Airport
 Marsa Matruh Airport
 Port Said Airport
 Ras Shokeir New Airport
 Sharm El Sheikh International Airport
 Sharq El Owainat Airport
 Sohag International Airport
 Sphinx International Airport
 St. Catherine International Airport

Balad Southeast Airport
Al Iskandariyah Airport
Ubaydah Bin Al Jarrah Airport
Al Najaf International Airport
An Numaniyah Airport
Baghdad International Airport
Bashur Airport
Basra International Airport
Erbil International Airport
Jalibah Southeast Airport
Kirkuk Airport
Mosul International Airport
Qasr Tall Airport
Qayyarah Airfield West
Sulaimaniyah International Airport
Tikrit East Airport
Tikrit South Airport
Umm Qasr Airport
Al Asad Airbase
Al Taqaddum Airbase
Al Taji AAF
Ali Air Base
Tall Afar AAF
Camp Speicher
Muthenna Airbase

Amman Civil Airport
H-4 Air Base
King Hussein Air Base
King Hussein International Airport
Prince Hassan Air Base
Queen Alia International Airport
Muwaffaq Salti Air Base

Kuwait International Airport
Ahmad al-Jaber Air Base
Ali Al Salem Air Base
Camp Buehring

Beirut Rafic Hariri International Airport
Rayak Air Base
Rene Mouawad Air Base
Wujah Al Hajar Air Base

 Al Jufra Air Base
 Alzintan Airport
 Bani Walid Airport
 Benina International Airport
 Brak Airport
 Gardabya Airport
 Ghadames Airport
 Ghat Airport
 Habit Awlad Muhammad Airport
 Hun Airport
 Kufra Airport
 La Abraq International Airport
 Maaten al-Sarra Air Base
 Marsa Brega Airport
 Martuba Air Base
 Misrata Airport
 Mitiga Airport
 Nanur Airport
 Okba Ibn Nafa Air Base
 Ra's Lanuf Airport
 Sabha Airport
 Tobruk Airport
 Tripoli International Airport
 Ubari Airport
 Waddan Airport
 Zuwarah Airport

Aioun el Atrouss Airport
Akjoujt Airport
Atar International Airport
Bir Moghrein Airport
Boutilimit Airport
Kaédi Airport
Kiffa Airport
Néma Airport
Nouadhibou International Airport
Nouakchott International Airport
Nouakchott–Oumtounsy International Airport
Sélibaby Airport
Tidjikja Airport
Tazadit Airport
Abbaye Airport
Fderik Airport
Tichitt Airport

 Al Massira Airport
 Anfa Airport 
 Angads Airport
 Bassatine Air Base
 Ben Slimane Airport
 Beni Mellal Airport
 Bouarfa Airport
 Cherif Al Idrissi Airport
 Dakhla Airport
 El Jadida Airport 
 Guelmim Airport
 Hassan I Airport (Laâyoune Airport)
 Ibn Battouta Airport
 Ifrane Airport
 Inezgane Airport
 Kenitra Air Base
 La Güera Airport 
 Marrakech-Menara Airport
 Mogador Airport
 Mohammed V International Airport
 Moulay Ali Cherif Airport
 Nador Airport (Al Aroui Airport)
 Ouarzazate Airport
 Ouezzane Airport
 Rabat-Salé Airport (First Royal Air Force Base)
 Safi Airport 
 Saïss Airport
 Sania Ramel Airport
 Sefrou Airport 
 Sidi Ifni Airport 
 Sidi Slimane Air Base
 Smara Airport
 Tan Tan Airport (Plage Blanche Airport)
 Taroudannt Airport
 Taza Airport
 Tit Mellil Airport
 Zagora Airport

Adam Airport
Duqm Jaaluni Airport
Qarn Alam Airport
Khasab Airport
Marmul Airport
Mukhaizna Airport
Muscat International Airport
Ras al Hadd Airport
Rustaq Airport
Saiq Airport
Salalah Airport
Sohar Airport
Yibal Airport
Izki Air Base
Manston Air Base
RAFO Masirah
RAFO Thumrait
Butabul Airport
Buraimi Airport
Dibba Airport
Fahud Airport
Haima Airport
Ibra Airport
Ibri Airport
Lekhwair Airport
Sur Airport

Jerusalem Atarot Airport
Gush Katif Airport
Muqeible Airfield
Yasser Arafat International Airport

Al Khor Airport
Doha International Airport
Hamad International Airport
Al Udeid Air Base

 Abha Regional Airport
 Abu Ali Airport
 Al Qaisumah/Hafr Al Batin Airport
 Al Wajh Domestic Airport
 Al-Ahsa International Airport
 Al-Baha Domestic Airport
 Al-Jawf Domestic Airport
 Arar Domestic Airport
 Bisha Domestic Airport
 King Salman Bin Abdulaziz Domestic Airport
 Gurayat Domestic Airport
 Ha'il Regional Airport
 Haradh Airport
 IPSA-3 Airport
 Jizan Regional Airport
 Jubail Airport
 Khafji Airport
 King Abdulaziz Air Base
 King Abdulaziz International Airport
 King Abdulaziz Naval Base
 King Fahd International Airport
 King Khaled Military City Airport
 King Khalid International Airport
 Najran Domestic Airport
 Prince Abdul Majeed bin Abdulaziz Domestic Airport
 Prince Abdul Mohsin bin Abdulaziz International Airport
 Prince Mohammad Bin Abdulaziz International Airport
 Prince Nayef Bin Abdulaziz Regional Airport
 Rafha Domestic Airport
 Ras Mishab Airport
 Ras Tanajib Airport
 Ras Tanura Airport
 Sharurah Domestic Airport
 Shaybah Airport
 Tabuk Regional Airport
 Ta'if Regional Airport
 Turaif Domestic Airport
 Wadi al-Dawasir Domestic Airport

Abudwak Airport
Alula Airport
Baidoa Airport
Berbera Airport
Borama Airport
Bosaso Airport
Ismail Mire International Airport
Aden Adde International Airport
Kismayo Airport
Adado Airport
Bardera Airport
Beledweyne Airport
Las Anod Airport
Burao Airport
Candala Airport
Dhusamareb Airport
Erigavo Airport
Eyl Airport
Iskushuban Airport
Lugh Ganane Airport
K50 Airstrip
Hobyo Airport
Taleh Airport
Qardho Airport

 Atbara Airport                                                                                                  
 Azaza Airport                                                                                                    
 Carthago Airport                                                                                                             
 Damazin Airport                                                                                                              
 Dilling Airport                                                                                                    
 Dongola Airport                                                                                                               
 Ed Daein Airport                                                                                                             
 El Daein Airport                                                                                                
 El Debba Airport                                                                                                              
 El Fasher Airport                                                                                                              
 El Obeid Airport                                                                                                               
 En Nahud Airport                                                                                                            
 Galegu Airport                                                                                                 
 Geneina Airport                                                                                                              
 Kadugli Airport                                                                                                 
 Kassala Airport                                                                                                 
 Kenana Airport                                                                                                
 Khartoum International Airport                                                                                                
 Khashm el Girba Airport                                                                                                               
 Merowe Airport                                                                                                              
 New Halfa Airport                                                                                                           
 Nyala Airport                                                                                                    
 Port Sudan Military Airport                                                                                                         
 Port Sudan New International Airport                                                                                                   
 Sennar Airport                                                                                                 
 Shendi Airport                                                                                                  
 Wad Medani Airport                                                                                                      
 Wadi Halfa Airport                                                                                                         
 Wadi Seidna Air Base                        
 Zalingei Airport    

 Abu Hajar Airfield
 Aleppo International Airport
 Bassel Al-Assad International Airport
 Damascus International Airport
 Deir ez-Zor Airport
 Qamishli Airport
 Malikiyah Municipal Airfield
 Palmyra Airport
 Hamidiyah Municipal Airfield
 Al Thaurah Airfield
 Tabqa Airport

Bizerte-Sidi Ahmed Air Base
Borj El Amri Airport
Djerba - Zarzis International Airport
El Borma Airport
Enfidha – Hammamet International Airport
Gabès - Matmata International Airport
Gafsa - Ksar International Airport
Monastir - Habib Bourguiba International Airport
Remada Air Base
Sfax - Thyna International Airport
Soliman Airstrip
Tabarka–Ain Draham International Airport
Thelepte Airfield
Tozeur - Nefta International Airport
Tunis - Carthage International Airport

 Abu Dhabi International Airport
 Al Ain International Airport
 Al Bateen Executive Airport
 Al Dhafra Air Base
 Al Jazeirah Airport
 Al Minhad Air Base
 Al Saqr Field Airport
 Arzanah Airport
 Buhasa Airport
 Dalma Airport
 Das Island Airport
 Dubai International Airport
 Dubai World Central - Al Maktoum International Airport
 Fujairah International Airport
 Futaysi Airport
 Jebel Dhana Airport
 Qarnayn Airport
 Ras Al Khaimah International Airport
 Sharjah International Airport
 Sir Bani Yas Airport
 Zirku Airport

 Abbs Airport
 Aden International Airport
 Al Bayda' Airport
 Al Ghaydah Airport
 Al Hazm Airport
 Albuq Airport
 Ataq Airport
 Beihan Airport
 Dathina Airport
 Dali' Airport
 Hodeida International Airport
 Kamaran Airport
 Marib Airport
 Riyan Airport
 Mukeiras Airport
 Qishn Airport
 Saadah Airport
 Sana'a International Airport
 Sayun Airport
 Socotra Airport
 Ta'izz International Airport

Heliports

See also
 Baghdad Railway
 Arab Mashreq International Railway
 Transport in Jordan

 
Arab League
Transport in Africa
Transport in Asia
Transport in the Middle East